Kumbakarai Thangaiah is a 1991 Indian Tamil-language film, directed by Gangai Amaran and produced by Ramumachan. The film stars Prabhu, Kanaka, Pandiyan and M. N. Nambiar. It was released on 14 January 1991.

Plot

Cast 

Prabhu
Kanaka
Pandiyan
M. N. Nambiar
Senthamarai
Raja Bagadhur
Babloo Prithiveeraj
S. S. Chandran
Senthil
Kovai Sarala
Gandhimathi
S. N. Lakshmi
S. N. Parvathy
V. Gopalakrishnan
A. K. Veerasami
Peeli Sivam
Rajaji
Periya Karuppu Thevar
Kullamani

Soundtrack 
The music was composed by Ilaiyaraaja. The lyrics for all songs were written by Gangai Amaran except "Ennai Oruvan", written by Ilaiyaraaja himself.

Reception 
Sundarji of Kalki gave the film a negative review, but said the music was a redeeming feature.

References

External links 
 

1990s Tamil-language films
1991 films
Films directed by Gangai Amaran
Films scored by Ilaiyaraaja